The  (stylized as K'SEI since 2001) is a major private railway in Chiba Prefecture and Tokyo, Japan. The combination uses different readings than the ones used in the city names. The railway's main line runs from Tokyo to Narita and the eastern suburb cities of Funabashi, Narashino, Yachiyo, and Sakura.

In addition to its railway business, the Keisei Electric Railway Company owns large bus and taxi services and some real estate holdings. It owns a large, controlling, share of the Oriental Land Company which owns and manages the Tokyo Disney Resort. Keisei is listed on the Tokyo Stock Exchange and is a constituent of the Nikkei 225 index.

History
Keisei was founded on June 30, 1909 and began services on November 3, 1912, initially operating local train service in eastern Tokyo. Its main line reached Narita in 1930 and Ueno in 1933.

In 1960, Keisei began through service with the Toei Asakusa Line, the first interline through service arrangement in Japan.

Skyliner service began in 1973 and started serving the airport in 1978, when the first Narita Airport Station opened (today's Higashi-Narita station). 
A new underground station was opened in 1991 to provide a more direct connection to terminal 1, and in 1992 service began to terminal 2.
On July 17, 2010, Skyliner switched its route to the newly built Narita Sky Access and reduced the travel time by 15 minutes.

Lines
Keisei operates  of railway that consists of one trunk line named the Main Line and six branch lines.

Legend
 "Type" indicates the type of railway business under the Railway Business Act of Japan. Type 1 operator owns and operates the railway while Type 2 operator operates but does not owns the railway.
 This section is shared by the Main Line and the Higashi-Narita Line.
 This section is shared by the Main Line and the Narita Airport Line.

Subsidiaries
Keisei Group includes:
 Shin-Keisei Electric Railway (Shin-Keisei Line)
 Chiba New Town Railway
 Hokusō Railway (Hokusō Line)
 Kantō Railway
 Kashima Railway Company (Kashima Railway Line, closed in 2007)
 Kominato Railway (Kominato Line)
 Maihama Resort Line (Disney Resort Line)
 Narita Airport Rapid Railway (Owner of a part of Narita Sky Access tracks)
 Nokogiriyama Ropeway
 The Oriental Land Company
 Tsukuba Kankō Railway (Mt. Tsukuba Cable Car and Mt. Tsukuba Ropeway)

Companies related to Keisei, although not a group member:
 Shibayama Railway
 Tōyō Rapid Railway (Tōyō Rapid Railway Line)

Rolling stock

Limited express
 AE series (since 2010)

Commuter
 3000 series (since 2003)
 3050 series (since 2010)
 3100 series (since 2019)
 3400 series (since 1993)
 3500 series (since 1972)
 3600 series (since 1982)
 3700 series (since 1991)

Former

Limited express
 1500 series (1941–1987)
 1600 series (1953–1981)
 AE series (1973–1993)
 AE100 series (1990–2016)

Commuter
 1 series (1912-1927)
 20 series (1921-1971)
 33/39/45 series (1923-1978)
 300 series (1955-1982)
 100/126 series (1926-1987)
 200/210/220/500/510 series (1931-1990)
 210/2000/2100 series (1932-1985)
 700/2200 series (1954-1982)
 750/2250 series (1954-1973)
 1100 series (1941-1987)
 1500 series (1941-1987)
 2000 series (1948-1990)
 3000 series (1958-1991)
 3050 series (1959-1995)
 3100 series (1960-1998)
 3150 series (1963-2001)
 3200 series (1964-2007)
 3300 series (1968-2015)

See also
Hokuso Railway
Tokyo Disneyland
Skyliner
Keisei Bus

References

External links

 Official site 
 English part of official site 

 
Railway companies of Japan
Companies listed on the Tokyo Stock Exchange
Japanese companies established in 1909
Companies based in Chiba Prefecture
Railway companies established in 1909
Midori-kai